Kuutti Lavonen (born 7 February 1960 in Kotka, Finland) is a Finnish painter, photographer, and graphic artist, who has worked as professor at the Academy of Fine Arts (Finland). His poetry book Havahtumisia was published in 2005 by Kirjapaja.

Lavonen contributed to the book St. Olaf's Church in Tyrvää. With Osmo Rauhala he painted the interior of St Olaf's Church in Tyrvää, Finland, after it was torched by a pyromaniac.

References

External links
Church of St Olaf, see title Artwork
Taiteilijan verkkosivusto (kuuttilavonen.com)

Living people
1960 births
People from Kotka
20th-century Finnish painters
21st-century Finnish painters
Finnish male painters
21st-century male artists
20th-century Finnish male artists